Tanta Sports Club is an Egyptian football and sports club based in Tanta, Egypt. The club plays in the Egyptian Premier League, the highest league in the Egyptian football league system. The club was established on 5 June 1926 and is one of the oldest football clubs in Africa.

Current squad

Current technical staff

{| class="toccolours"
!bgcolor=silver|Position
!bgcolor=silver|Name
!bgcolor=silver|Nationality
|- bgcolor=#eeeeee
|Manager:||Reda Abdel Aal||
|- 
|Assistant manager:||Ahmed Hamouda||
|- bgcolor=#eeeeee
|Assistant manager:||Waleed El Mahrouki||
|- bgcolor=#eeeeee
|Goalkeeping coach:||Walid Ibrahim||
|-

Managerial history

 Ayman El Mizzayn 
 Mohamed Salah 
 Ahmed Samy  
 Ayman El Mizzayn 
 Reda Abdel Aal

References

Football clubs in Egypt
1920 establishments in Egypt
Sports clubs in Egypt